Alex O'Brien (born ) is an American former doubles world No. 1 tennis player. He gained the top ranking in May 2000 and was ranked as high as world No. 30 in singles in June 1997.

He won his only singles title at New Haven, Connecticut, in 1996 and reached the quarterfinals of the 1994 Cincinnati Masters and the 1996 Canada Masters. He won 13 doubles titles, the biggest coming at the 1999 US Open, the Cincinnati Masters in 1994 (his first doubles title), the Indian Wells Masters in 2000, and the Paris Masters in 1999.

Tennis career
Alongside his 13 titles, O'Brien also reached 20 doubles finals, including the Australian Open in 1996 & 1997, the U.S. Open in 1995, the Miami Masters in 1998, and the Canada Masters and the Rome Masters in 1997.

He also played on the United States Davis Cup team, competed in the 2000 Sydney Olympics, and was a four-time All-American at Stanford University, where he won NCAA singles, doubles, and team titles in 1992. He earned a bachelor's degree in American Studies at Stanford in 1992.

On leaving his tennis career O'Brien founded an online business which markets, and distributes steaks. The O'Brien family has been in the beef business for 60 years basing their production out of the LIT Ranch.  O'Brien is currently President and part owner of the Bank of Commerce, a small community online bank with branches in Amarillo and McLean Texas.

Grand Slam finals

Doubles (1 title, 3 runners-ups)

ATP career finals

Singles: 1 (1 title)

Doubles: 33 (13 titles, 20 runner-ups)

ATP Challenger and ITF Futures finals

Singles: 9 (5–4)

Doubles: 7 (5–2)

Performance Timelines

Singles

Doubles

External links
 
 
 
 
 

1970 births
Living people
American male tennis players
Sportspeople from Amarillo, Texas
Stanford Cardinal men's tennis players
Tennis people from Texas
US Open (tennis) champions
Tennis players at the 2000 Summer Olympics
Grand Slam (tennis) champions in men's doubles
Olympic tennis players of the United States
ATP number 1 ranked doubles tennis players